Get Wiser is the second full-length studio album by the reggae band SOJA that was released in January 2006. The album release party was held at The State Theatre in Falls Church, Virginia and was filmed for the Get Wiser Live DVD.

Track listing
 Open My Eyes
 By My Side (feat. (Junior Marvin)
 My Life Alone
 Faith Works
 What Would...?
 Strong For Them
 Can't Tell Me (feat. Carmelo Romero)
 Be Aware
 I've Got Time
 Sorry (feat. Go-Go Mickey)
 Bring Back Truth
 You Don't Know Me (feat. (Junior Marvin)
 911
 Devils (feat. The Eddie Drennon String Quartet)

References

External links
SOJAmusic.com

SOJA albums
2006 albums